Band Bast-e Pain (also Romanized as Band Bast-e Pā’īn; also known as Band Bast) is a village in Mobarakabad Rural District, in the Central District of Qir and Karzin County, Fars Province, Iran. At the 2006 census, its population was 562, in 132 families.

References 

Populated places in Qir and Karzin County